Weightlifting was part of the 1965 National Games of China held in Beijing. Only men competed in seven bodyweight categories which mostly mirrored the international standard at the time. In 1965 the Chinese Weightlifting Association was not yet a member federation of the IWF.

The competition program at the National Games mirrors that of the Olympic Games as only medals for the total achieved are awarded, but not for individual lifts in either the snatch or clean and jerk. Likewise an athlete failing to register a snatch result cannot advance to the clean and jerk.

Medal summary

Men

Medal table

References
Archived results of the 1965 Games 

1965 in weightlifting
1965
Weight